Stephen Yenser (born 1941, Wichita, Kansas, United States) is an American poet and literary critic who has published three acclaimed volumes of verse, as well as books on James Merrill, Robert Lowell, and an assortment of contemporary poets. With J.D. McClatchy, he is co-literary executor of the James Merrill estate and co-editor of six volumes of Merrill's work.

Life
Yenser graduated from the University of Wisconsin, studying with James Merrill in 1967 on one of the rare occasions when the poet taught. Merrill dedicated to Yenser his final, posthumous collection, A Scattering of Salts (1995).

Yenser is Professor of English Emeritus and founding Director of Creative Writing at the University of California, Los Angeles, curating the Hammer Poetry Series at the Hammer Museum.

His work has appeared in Paris Review, Poetry, Southwest Review, Yale Review, "The New Yorker," and many other magazines. He lives in Los Angeles with his wife Melissa Berton and daughter Helen.

Awards
Appearances in BEST AMERICAN POETRY anthologies 1992, 1995, 2011
1992 Walt Whitman Award. selected by Richard Howard
"Discovery"/The Nation Award
Fulbright Teaching Fellowships to Greece and France
Ingram Merrill Foundation Award in Poetry
Pushcart Prize
B. F. Connors Prize for Poetry from the Paris Review.
Harvey L. Eby Teaching Award at UCLA

Works

Poetry
Stone Fruit(Waywiser Press, 2016), poetry 93 pages, 
Blue Guide (University of Chicago Press, 2006), poetry, 96 pages, 
The Fire in All Things (LSU Press, 1993), poetry, 64 pages,

Essays
A Boundless Field: American Poetry at Large (University of Michigan Press, 2002), Poets on Poetry Series, 256 pages, 
The Consuming Myth: The Work of James Merrill (Harvard University Press, 1987), 384 pages, 
Circle to Circle: The Poetry of Robert Lowell (University of California Press,1976), 370 pages,

Editor

Other

References

External links 

 Stephen Yenser Papers Relating to James Merrill. Yale Collection of American Literature, Beinecke Rare Book and Manuscript Library.

Writers from Wichita, Kansas
University of California, Los Angeles faculty
University of Wisconsin–Madison alumni
Writers from California
1941 births
Living people
American male poets
Poets from Kansas
20th-century American poets
21st-century American poets
20th-century American male writers
21st-century American male writers